Gregorio Prieto Muñoz (2 May 1897 – 14 November 1992) was a Spanish painter associated with the Generation of '27.

Life
He was born in Valdepeñas (where he later also died), the eighth son of Ildefonso Prieto (a cabinet-maker who seems to have studied architecture) and  Froilana Muñoz (owner of a large shop in the town). When he was two his mother died and his father remarried to Tadea Solance, who Gregorio always loved like a birth-mother. When he was four he started drawing and then painting in watercolour, then when he was seven the family moved to Madrid, where his father opened a cabinet shop.

Fundación Gregorio Prieto

Works

Literature

Art 
 Paintings and Drawings. With an Introduction by Luis Cernuda. London: The Falcon Press, 1947: 11 pages of introduction and 47 prints, with one of the prints in color..

References

Bibliography (in Spanish) 
 Enciclopedia biográfica española. Barcelona: J. M. Massó, 1955.

External links 

 Gregorio Prieto en la edición del 6 de feb. de 1976 del programa de La 2 (TVE) A fondo, con Joaquín Soler Serrano.
 Archivo epistolar digitalizado de Gregorio Prieto
 Gregorio Prieto Museum

1897 births
1992 deaths
20th-century Spanish painters
20th-century Spanish male artists